Machibuse is a 1970 Japanese drama film directed by Hiroshi Inagaki.

Cast 
 Toshiro Mifune − 'Yojimbo'
 Yujiro Ishihara − Yataro
 Ruriko Asaoka − Okuni
 Shintaro Katsu − Gentetsu
 Kinnosuke Nakamura − Heima Ibuki
  Chusha Ichikawa − Unknown Samurai

Plot
A ronin (Toshiro Mifune, often referred to as "yojimbo") is instructed to go to a mountain pass and await further instructions. On the way he rescues Okuni (Ruriko Asaoka), a woman abused by her husband. While at a roadside inn, the ronin meets several characters including the disgraced doctor, Gentetsu (Shintaro Katsu), a pompous police constable, and a criminal he has arrested. The ronin uncovers a plot for bandits to steal gold as it is being transported along the mountain pass. As Mifune's yojimbo had done in previous plots, he plays all sides and pretends to aid the bandits. At the end another layer to the scheme is uncovered, and the mastermind who dispatched the ronin and informed the bandits about the gold is the same person. There was never any gold, and it was all a ruse to have the bandits killed.

Release
Machibuse was produced by Toshiro Mifune's production company and released in Japan by Toho on April 29, 1970. It was released by Toho International in the United States with English subtitles as The Ambush on December 18, 1970. The film was re-issued in 1971 under the title Machibuse. It is also known in English under the name, "Incident at Blood Pass."

Actors Toshiro Mifune and Shintaro Katsu performed in movies produced by each other. Earlier, in January of 1970, another film starring Mifune and Katsu was released, Zatoichi Meets Yojimbo. That film was produced by Katsu's own production company.

Reception
Despite its big budget and the appearance of four of the country's biggest stars, the film was not a success.

References

Footnotes

Sources

External links 

1970 drama films
1970 films
Films directed by Hiroshi Inagaki
Films with screenplays by Hideo Oguni
1970s Japanese-language films
Films scored by Masaru Sato
Toho films
1970s Japanese films